The National Liberal Party (PNL) was the first organised political party in Romania, a major force in the country's politics from its foundation in 1875 to World War II. Established in order to represent the interests of the nascent local bourgeoisie, until World War I it contested power with the Conservative Party, supported primarily by wealthy landowners, effectively creating a two-party system in a political system which severely limited the representation of the peasant majority through census suffrage. Unlike its major opponent, the PNL managed to preserve its prominence after the implementation of universal male suffrage, playing an important role in shaping the institutional framework of Greater Romania during the 1920s.

History 

Dominated throughout its existence by the Brătianu family, the party was periodically affected by strong factionalism. Among the many splits during the party's early history a notable one was that led by party founder C. A. Rosetti, whose followers, supporting rapid and more extensive social reforms, created the Radical Party in the late 1880s. In domestic matters, the National Liberal party supported the development of the local bourgeoisie, seeking to expand the Romanian industry through government subsidies and a protectionist trade policy. Party elites controlled major Romanian-owned enterprises and a significant part the local finance sector, including the National Bank of Romania. At the beginning of the 20th century, PNL, joined by many former leaders of the Romanian Social Democratic Workers' Party, advocated an extension of the electoral franchise and a limited agrarian reform, though this did not prevent a National Liberal government from violently repressing the 1907 Peasants' revolt. Adopting a nationalist discourse, before World War I the party championed the cause of ethnic Romanians living outside the borders, primarily those in Austro-Hungarian-ruled Transylvania; its irredentism varied in degree, with a more pragmatic approach being preferred while in government. Traditionally Francophile, in foreign policy PNL supported cooperation with the Triple Entente, against King Carol's preference for the Central Powers. The party's stance had a major influence in Romania's decision to join the First World War on the side of the Allies, which ultimately led to Romanian rule over Bessarabia, Bukovina and Transylvania. Seeing the post-War Minority Treaties as an encroachment on the country's sovereignty, between the World Wars PNL governments pursued a strong policy of centralisation, dismissing calls for autonomy coming from the newly attached provinces and seeking to limit the influence of the national minorities, as well as that of foreign capital. In foreign policy, it supported the cordon sanitaire against the Soviet Union, also cracking down on the local workers' movement.

Though initially opposed to the restoration of deposed King Carol II, it became increasingly supportive of his authoritarian policies, with PNL governments paving the way to a royal dictatorship in the 1938. Another major split was caused in 1930 by opposing attitudes towards the restoration of Carol II: Gheorghe I. Brătianu contested Vintilă Brătianu's decision to oppose the King and created parallel organisations, claiming the party's name and legacy. After Vintilă's death, his faction came under the control of Ion Gh. Duca and Gheorghe Tătărescu, realigned with Carol and led several governments, while Gheorghe's continued as a separate party, in opposition to the former's government. The two however reunited shortly before the dissolution of all parties in 1938.  Formally disbanded along all political parties in 1938, party structures were preserved unofficially, with many party members also enlisting in Carol's National Renaissance Front. The growing power of Nazi Germany in the 1930s led some factions, primarily the one controlled by Gheorghe I. Brătianu, to seek a rapprochement with the former war enemy from 1936 onward; during World War II, PNL leaders supported Romania's participation in the Axis-led invasion of the Soviet Union, while maintaining contacts with the Western Allies, ultimately backing the realignment with the latter in August 1944. Tolerated by the totalitarian government of Ion Antonescu, it eventually joined King Michael I and the Communist, National Peasants' and Social Democratic parties in overthrowing the dictator in the closing phase of World War II, enabling the reorganisation of the party in 1944. Part of the first post-war grand coalition governments, it lost its importance as the new Communist-led coalition government used the denazification process in order to remove PNL supporters from government posts.

The last major split was motivated by the attitude towards the Communist-dominated left-wing alliance in the aftermath of World War II: while Dinu Brătianu, the party's president, opposed the increasing Communist influence, Tătărescu, the general secretary, favoured an alliance with it, hoping to preserve some influence in the Soviet-dominated political context. Both factions claimed the name and legacy of the original party, and, after a period of ambiguity, went on to create parallel organisations. Faced with a severe restriction of its activity by the Communist-dominated government, the first faction dissolved itself in late 1947. The second faction continued to be part of the governing coalitions until November 1947; nevertheless, Tătărescu's opposition to the policy of extensive economic planning pursued by the government led to his replacement as party leader with Petre Bejan. Forced into submission, the faction did not have any political activity after 1950. Deprived of their economic base, members of both factions also suffered political persecution after 1948. With the Communist-dominated government gaining the upper hand in local politics and starting to crack down on opposition, the party decided to cease political activity in the late 1947, effectively disbanding itself. After the overthrow of the Communist party rule in 1989, a new party was founded under the same name and assumed the National Liberal legacy.After the war, the Dinu Brătianu faction supported Anglo-American interests, while Tătărescu's sought a more pragmatic approach towards the Big Three and friendly relation with the Soviets.

Scissions and mergers

Parties seceded from PNL 
 National Liberal Party-Brătianu (1930)
 National Liberal Party–Tătărescu/Bejan (1944)

Parties absorbed by PNL 
 National Liberal Party-Brătianu (1938)

Party leaders

Electoral history

Legislative elections

Notes:
 Almost always the government was named before parliamentary elections and confirmed afterwards;
 Votes received in alliance with PCD;
 Votes received by National Union coalition. Coalition members: PNL, PGR, LA, and PND.

References

National Liberal Party (Romania)
Defunct political parties in Romania
Defunct liberal political parties
Liberal parties in Romania
Nationalist parties in Romania
National liberal parties
Political parties established in 1875
1875 establishments in Romania
Romanian nationalist parties
Formerly banned political parties